The 2016–17 Premier League was the 25th season of the Premier League, the top English professional league for association football clubs, since its establishment in 1992, and the 118th season of top-flight English football overall. The season began on 13 August 2016 and concluded on 21 May 2017. Fixtures for the 2016–17 season were announced on 15 June 2016.

Chelsea won their fifth Premier League title, and sixth English title, with two matches to spare following a 1–0 away win over West Bromwich Albion on 12 May. 

The defending champions were Leicester City, who finished 12th, thereby setting a new record for the worst Premier League title defence; the record had previously been held by Chelsea, who had finished 10th in 2015–16 after winning the title in 2014–15. When including the Football League era, it was the worst title defence since 1991–92 champions Leeds United finished 17th in 1992–93. 

Burnley, Middlesbrough and Hull City entered as the three promoted teams from the 2015–16 Football League Championship.

Overview

Premier League rebranding
On 9 February 2016, the Premier League announced a rebrand; beginning with the 2016–17 season, the competition was known simply as the Premier League, without any sponsor's name attached. As part of the rebranding, a new logo was introduced.

Ticket prices
From the beginning of the 2016–17 season, ticket prices for away fans were capped at £30 per ticket.

Summary
Antonio Conte enjoyed a successful start as Chelsea manager, winning the title in his first season at the club and earning a record number of league victories for a season, with only poor early form preventing them from also setting a new points total. Tottenham Hotspur shrugged off a disappointing Champions League campaign to push Chelsea close for the title, though they ultimately missed out. However, they finished the season with statistically both the best attack and defence, with striker Harry Kane once again claiming the Golden Boot. Furthermore, the season marked the end of Tottenham's 118-year stay at the White Hart Lane stadium, temporarily using Wembley for the subsequent season, before a new stadium move. Manchester City finished one spot better than the previous season in Pep Guardiola's first season in charge, though ended the season trophy-less, despite recording the third-best attack and reaching the semi-finals of the FA Cup. Liverpool made the Champions League for the first time in three years in Jürgen Klopp's first full season, though they were prevented from finishing any higher than fourth by an inconsistent start to 2017, a consequence of both losing their £35 million signing Sadio Mané to international duty in January and February as well as suffering from several dropped points against bottom-half teams.

Despite winning seven of their final eight games, Arsenal finished fifth and failed to qualify for the Champions League for the first time since 1997, as fan pressure on both manager Arsène Wenger and majority-shareholder Stan Kroenke grew. While they did win the FA Cup for the third time in four seasons, making Wenger the most successful manager in the competition's history, they endured yet another disappointing Champions League run, eliminated at the round of 16 for a seventh successive year. Manchester United finished sixth, one lower than the previous season, in José Mourinho's first season in charge, with their failure to turn any one of their 15 draws – with 12 earned amidst the season-record 25 matches unbeaten run – into victories proving problematic. They did at least win the EFL Cup and won the Europa League final. The latter was the first Europa League title in their history, not only securing a place in the Champions League but also made them only the fifth club to have won all three major European trophies. Everton, the final team to qualify for the UEFA competitions, made their first return to that level for 3 years. Under Ronald Koeman, who replaced Roberto Martínez following his sacking towards the end of the previous season after a period of mid-table stagnation, the club would spend virtually the entire season in the Europa League places; never mounting any serious push for the Champions League places, but always remaining well clear of the rest of the league. This also meant that for the fourth time in seven seasons, the top seven positions were occupied by the same teams.

In only their second-ever top-flight season, AFC Bournemouth built on the success of the previous season as they secured a ninth-place finish and scored 55 goals, defying the critics who had tipped them to struggle from second-season syndrome. Much as Chelsea had the previous season, Leicester City made a poor defence of their title, despite having what turned out to be the best Champions League run of any English club this season. They were beaten by Hull City in the first match, the first time this has happened to a reigning Premier League champion. With the club struggling, manager Claudio Ranieri was sacked in February and replaced by coach Craig Shakespeare, who steered the club to 12th. It broke the record of the lowest finish for Premier League title holders, set by Chelsea the previous season by finishing 10th, but comfortably clear of relegation.

Swansea City had looked dead and buried after early struggles under Francesco Guidolin and then a disastrous spell with Bob Bradley as manager, but were saved by a late improvement under Paul Clement's management. Burnley fared the best of the promoted clubs, with only atrocious away form preventing them finishing higher as they made their home-ground of Turf Moor one of the hardest places to get a point from – and secured a second successive top-flight season for the first time in 40 years. Watford, in their first successive top-flight campaign for 30 years, successfully ensured a third consecutive Premier League season – however, as a result of poor away form, a disastrous end to the season and several spells of indifferent form throughout the campaign, the Hornets were unable to really build on the previous season despite recording their first league victories over Manchester United and at Arsenal since the 1980s.

After several successive escapes from relegation, Sunderland's resilience finally broke and they dropped into the Championship after a decade, having spent virtually the entire season rooted to the bottom of the table. Middlesbrough also struggled through their first top-flight season in eight years, with a poor end to the season, the weakest goal-scoring record in the division and an inability to turn one of their 13 draws into victories dooming them. Hull City were the final relegated side, never quite recovering from a disastrous pre-season which saw manager Steve Bruce quit and next to no new players signed. Despite encouraging early season form under Mike Phelan, a dismal run in the winter saw him sacked and replaced by Marco Silva, who steered the club to a much better second half of the season, but it ultimately proved to be a case of too little, too late.

Teams
Twenty teams competed in the league – the top seventeen teams from the previous season and the three teams promoted from the Championship. The promoted teams were Burnley, Middlesbrough and Hull City. Burnley and Hull City returned to the top flight after a season's absence while Middlesbrough returned after a seven-year absence. They replaced Newcastle United, Norwich City and Aston Villa, ending their top flight spells of six, one and twenty-eight years respectively.

Stadiums and locations

''Note: Table lists in alphabetical order.

Personnel and kits

 1Per Mertesacker was the official captain of Arsenal, but due to a season long injury, Laurent Koscielny filled in as playing captain.
 Additionally, referee kits were made by Nike, sponsored by EA Sports, and Nike had a new match ball, the Ordem Premier League.

Managerial changes

League table

Results

Season statistics

Scoring

Top scorers

Hat-tricks

Notes
4 Player scored 4 goals(H) – Home team(A) – Away team

Clean sheets

Discipline

Player

Most yellow cards: 14
 José Holebas (Watford)

Most red cards: 2 
 Miguel Britos (Watford)
 Fernandinho (Manchester City)
 Granit Xhaka (Arsenal)

Club

Most yellow cards: 84 
Watford

Most red cards: 5
Hull City
Watford
West Ham United

Awards

Monthly awards

Annual awards

References

External links

 
Premier League seasons
Eng
1